Dr. Sarvepalli Radhakrishnan Government Arts College, is a general degree college located in Yanam, Puducherry. It was established in the year 1973. The college is affiliated with Pondicherry University. This college offers different courses in arts, commerce and science.

Departments

Science
Physics
Chemistry
Mathematics
Botany
Zoology
Computer Science

Arts and Commerce
Telugu
English
Hindi
Economics
Commerce

Accreditation
The college is  recognized by the University Grants Commission (UGC).

References

External links

Universities and colleges in Puducherry
Educational institutions established in 1973
1973 establishments in Pondicherry
Colleges affiliated to Pondicherry University